The Lundberg lag, named after the Swedish economist Erik Lundberg, stresses the lag between changes in the demand and response in output.  This is one lag which points out that business cycles do not follow a completely random fashion but can be explained with a few different important regularities.

See also
Robertson lag

Notes and references

Business cycle